An election to Monaghan County Council took place on 24 May 2019 as part of that year's local elections. All 18 councillors were elected for a five-year term of office from 3 local electoral areas (LEAs) by single transferable vote. The 2018 LEA boundary review committee kept the LEAs used in the 2014 elections, adjusting the boundaries and moving one seat from Ballybay–Clones LEA to Monaghan LEA.

Bucking a trend elsewhere Sinn Féin slightly increased their vote in Monaghan. However this did not prevent the party from losing a seat in the Carrickmacross-Castleblayney LEA but Sinn Féin would still remain the largest party. The Sinn Féin loss was to former Carrickmacross TC Cllr, Mary Kerr-Conlon. However the Fine Gael vote in Monaghan fell by over 5% a consequence of Hugh McElvaney retaining his seat in Ballybay-Clones as an Independent.

Results by party

Results by local electoral area

Ballybay–Clones

Carrickmacross–Castleblayney

Monaghan

Results by gender

Footnotes

References

Sources
 
 
 
 
 

2019 Irish local elections
Monaghan County Council elections